NGC 1249 is a barred spiral galaxy in the constellation Horologium. It was discovered by John Herschel on December 5, 1834.

See also
 List of NGC objects (1001–2000)

References

External links

Barred spiral galaxies
Horologium (constellation)
1249
Dorado Group
011836